Stevie Bonsey (born January 18, 1990) is an American motorcycle racer.

Career statistics

Grand Prix motorcycle racing

By season

Races by year
(key) (Races in bold indicate pole position, races in italics indicate fastest lap)

References

 Profile on MotoGP.com

1990 births
Living people
American motorcycle racers
125cc World Championship riders
250cc World Championship riders